Ciliopagurus babai is a species of hermit crab native to Wakayama.

References

Hermit crabs
Crustaceans described in 1995